Godfrey Abulu  was a Ghanaian politician who served as a member of the first Parliament of the fourth Republic representing the Navrongo Central constituency in the Upper East Region of Ghana.

Early life and education 
Godfrey Abulu was born at Navrongo Central in the Upper East Region of Ghana.

Politics 
Abulu was elected into parliament on the ticket of the National Democratic Congress during the 1992 Ghanaian parliamentary election to represent the Navrongo Central constituency in the Upper East Region of Ghana. John Setuni Achuliwor (then an independent candidate) took over his seat in a by-election on 4 July 1995 after his death. Clement Tumfuga Bugase succeeded Achuliwor after winning the 1996 election with 16,811 votes out of the total valid votes cast representing 41.1%. His opponent John Setuni Achuliwor polled 15,599 votes representing 38.1%.

Career 
Abulu is a former member of parliament for the Navrongo Central Constituency in the Upper East Region of Ghana. He once served as deputy secretary (deputy Minister) for Agriculture and acting Regional Minister for the Upper East Region.

Personal life and death 
Abulu was a Christian. He died in June 1995.

References 

1995 deaths
Ghanaian Christians
National Democratic Congress (Ghana) politicians
People from Upper East Region
Ghanaian MPs 1993–1997